Oded Béjà is a professor in the Technion- Israel Institute of Technology, in the field of marine microbiology and metagenomics. Oded Béjà is best known for discovering the first bacterial rhodopsin naming it proteorhodopsin, during his postdoctoral fellowship in the laboratory of Edward DeLong. Oded Béjà's laboratory focuses currently on the role and diversity of photosynthetic viruses infecting cyanobacteria in the oceans, and the use of functional metagenomics for the discovery of new light sensing proteins. Recently the team of Oded Beja discovered a new family of rhodopsins with an inverted membrane topology, which can be found in bacteria, algae, algal viruses and archaea. Members of the new family were named heliorhodopsins.

Early life and education 
Oded Béjà graduated with a B.Sc. degree from the Robert H. Smith Faculty of Agriculture, Food and Environment - Hebrew University of Jerusalem. He earned his M.Sc. and Ph.D. from the Weizmann Institute of Science in 1998.

Honoraria, Fellowships, and Memberships 
Editorial board of the International Society for Microbial Ecology

Faculty Member of the Year 2012 by Faculty of 1000.

EMBO Young Investigator 2002-2004

American Society for Photobiology 2002  New Investigator Award.

Ranked 443 in the Ranking of scientists in Israel Institutions according to their Google Scholar Citations public profiles

References 

Israeli microbiologists
Living people
1964 births